Nighty Night is a BBC black comedy television sitcom starring Julia Davis. It was first broadcast on 6 January 2004 on BBC Three.

Notorious for its dark humour, the show follows narcissistic sociopath Jill Tyrell (Julia Davis) alongside her moronic personal assistant Linda (Ruth Jones). Jill learns that her husband Terry (Kevin Eldon) has cancer. She uses this to manipulate new neighbour Cathy Cole (Rebecca Front), who suffers from MS, and her husband Don (Angus Deayton), a doctor and the man with whom Jill becomes increasingly obsessed.

Production 
The theme tune used in the beginning of both series and during the closing credits for the first is an excerpt from the Spaghetti Western My Name Is Nobody, composed by the Italian film composer Ennio Morricone.

Cast and characters

Main cast
 Julia Davis as Jill Tyrell
 Rebecca Front as Cathy Cole
 Angus Deayton as Don Cole
 Kevin Eldon as Terry Tyrell (season 1)
 Ruth Jones as Linda
 Mark Gatiss as Glenn Bulb
 Felicity Montagu as Sue 2
 Michael Fenton Stevens as Gordon Fox (season 1; guest season 2)

Supporting cast 
 Kitty Fitzgerald as Joy (season 1)
 Ralph Brown as Jacques (season 2)
 Miranda Hart as Beth (season 2)
 Llewella Gideon as Floella Umbagabe (season 2)
 Loui Batley as Natalie (season 2)
 Marc Wootton as Gary Furze (season 1) and Dennis (season 2)
 Georgie Glen as Sister May (season 1) and Bluebell (season 2)

Plot

First series 
Immediately after her husband begins cancer treatment, Jill goes to a dating agency to find another man, seemingly content in the knowledge that her husband will shortly die. Jill uses her status as widow (despite Terry being still alive) to gain sympathy from her neighbors and coworkers. Don is a family doctor and his wife Cathy has multiple sclerosis and often uses a wheelchair. Using the pretence of caring for Cathy, Jill gradually moves in with them, flirting with their son David and trying to break up their marriage and sleep with Don, all the while playing the sympathy card with Cathy.

When Jill finds out Terry is recovering, she admits him to a hospice and tells all her friends that he has died, and stages a twisted funeral where she gets all the attention. Terry leaves the hospice and finds his way home. Jill imprisons him in a spare room and begins starving and brutalising him, but explains she is doing it only to aid his recovery.

Cathy and Don put forward their plans to move to Hopperton, a Christian retreat with a high population of lesbians. When Jill hears of this she throws a farewell coffee morning for them, livening it up by performing a pole dance routine, whilst the neighbours watch in horror. After the party Jill, realising she must be rid of Terry once and for all, runs upstairs and smothers him with a cushion.

Three weeks pass, and Jill has moved in with the wealthy but dimwitted Glen at his mansion. One morning, Jill goes downstairs to find Glen has invited Gordon, the local vicar and friend of Jill, to arrange a wedding. Jill realises she is about to be found out, so confesses to murdering her husband to Glen. She puts poison in dishes of Angel Delight and encourages Gordon to eat some. As he chokes on it, she tells Glen that if he loves her he would agree to take the blame for Gordon's and Terry's deaths and persuades him to make a telephone confession to the police. This done, Jill suggests that they both commit suicide by eating the Angel Delight, and he gives in to her persuasion. When it is her turn to eat the Angel Delight, she declares, "I'm not really hungry". The poison takes effect and Glen drops to the floor.

With Glen having taken the blame for Gordon and Terry's deaths, Jill rings Don.

Second series 
Glen has survived Jill's attempt to kill him, but having confessed to killing Terry and Gordon, he is incarcerated in a secure unit for the criminally insane. Realising that she must inherit Glen's money to fund her pursuit of Don, she agrees to marry him and then begins a campaign to kill him. Jill steals a caravan from Linda and pursues Don to Bude, Cornwall, where he and Cath are trying fix their marriage at a New-Age retreat called The Trees. En route to The Trees, they accidentally run over Floella Umbagabe, a therapist planning to work at the retreat. They store her body in their caravan and Jill assumes Floella's identity to gain access to the centre.

When Cathy reveals she is pregnant with Don's baby and that he will be having a vasectomy, Jill realises her chances of securing him permanently are running out, so she tries to obtain a semen sample from Don prior to surgery. Ultimately unsuccessful, she tries to seduce Cath and Don's 12-year-old son Bruce, and when he does not respond she claims to his parents that he raped her and she is pregnant by him.

Meanwhile, Glen has tunnelled his way out of his cell and has tracked Jill to Cornwall; Floella Umbagabe has recovered and arrived at The Trees, exposing Jill as a fraud.

The story flashes forward 11 months. Cath has given birth to her baby Abigail. Don tells Sue that he wants to move to Spain with her to start a new life. Jill overhears and assumes Don is talking about her. Glen finds Jill and threatens to kill her. Convincing him that she's pregnant with his baby, Jill once again deceives Glen into submission.

After Jill's lies are once again exposed, she is chased to a cliff, where Cath confronts her about her fake pregnancy and her repeated attempts to seduce Don. They begin to fight while Don and Sue have sex on the rocks below. Cath's wheelchair is hurled off the cliff, killing Sue just before Cath pushes Jill off the cliff. Her fall is broken by a trampoline, and then by Don. Cath is arrested and taken away by the police, while Jill rides off in a speed boat with Don and Glen.

International broadcast 
In Australia, this programme commenced airing on ABC TV each Wednesday at 9pm from 23 March 2005.

Reception 
The first series won a Banff Award and Davis won a Royal Television Society Award for her performance and got a highly positive reception from TV critics.

The Guardian called it "an exquisitely vile comic creation" and adding that "The Office might have popularised the comedy of embarrassment, but Nighty Night has moved it on." The Times called it "a blistering wall of superbly unredeemed cruelty that manages to trample over every social convention in a pair of cheap stilettos."

US version 
In June 2006 it was announced that Sex and the City creator Darren Star would write and be executive producer of a US version, which has been commissioned for a pilot script. Steve Coogan and Henry Normal, founders of the production company Baby Cow, were to be co-executive-producers.

References

External links 
 
 
 
 

2004 British television series debuts
2005 British television series endings
2000s British black comedy television series
2000s British sitcoms
BBC black comedy television shows
BBC television sitcoms
English-language television shows
Television about mental health
Narcissism in fiction
Television shows set in Surrey